The Centa is a very short Italian river in the province of Savona.

Geography 
Its source is near the Italian village of Leca (Albenga), at the junction between Arroscia and Neva. The river flows south before emptying into the Ligurian Sea near Albenga.

History 

The river flowed up to the 12th century in a bed further east, joining the sea near Ceriale. Its course was diverted to the present bed following a decision of the Republic of Genoa. The name Centa comes from cinta (Italian for town wall), because the new flow flanked the town wall of Albenga. The old river bed became almost totally dry from the 16th century

References

External links 

 History of the river: Il Centa e la sua storia millenaria

See also
 List of rivers of Italy

Drainage basins of the Ligurian Sea
Rivers of Italy
Rivers of Liguria
Rivers of the Province of Savona